Shangri-La Speedway was a speedway in Owego, New York.  It was a half-mile (0.8 km) oval race track facility. Over a span of fifty years, Shangri-La hosted automobile races of various kinds, AAA Championship Cars, stock cars, Modifieds, Supermodifieds, and supporting classes.  Shangri-La's weekly racing was widely considered among the best in the sport during several different periods, including years when nine-time NASCAR National Modified Champion Richie Evans and six-time NASCAR National Modified Champion Jerry Cook were regulars.  The facility also included an eighth-mile (0.2 km) drag strip and a tenth-mile oval track for microds (a type of wooden-bodied go-kart raced in many clubs in upstate New York).  Its formal name was changed to Shangri-La Motor Speedway (in use from 1979 to 1991) and to Tioga Motorsports Park (in use from 1992 to 2005), but most racers and fans still referred to it as "Shangri-La".

The speedway hosted one NASCAR Cup Series event in 1952 and the race was won by Tim Flock.

Track history
Shangri-La Speedway was opened in 1946 by Bill Owen who planned and built the track with help of family members; was re-opened in 1959 by a group of area drag racers; and was re-opened in 1962 by Fran Gitchell.  It was closed in 1956 due to neglect and small crowds; was closed in 1959 after a few drag events; and was finally closed for good after 2005 to allow gravel mining from the property. The track itself is all gone and all grandstands and buildings have been demolished.

A replacement track in nearby Tioga Center, known as Shangri-La II Motor Speedway, opened in 2009 and closed after an abbreviated 2015 season.

Photo gallery

Weekly featured division and sanctioning body
1946–48:  ESRA (Eastern States Racing Association) Sprints
1949:  ESRA Sprints and unsanctioned Stock Cars
1950–56:  unsanctioned Stock Cars
1959:  NASCAR drag racing
1962–64:  unsanctioned Supermodifieds and Modifieds
1965–72:  unsanctioned Modifieds
1973–75:  NASCAR National Modified
1976–78:  NEARA (Northeast Auto Racing Association) Modifieds
1979–2000:  NASCAR National Modified
2001–2005:  unsanctioned Modifieds

Visits by major touring series
1946–48:  AAA Championship Cars, AAA Sprint Cars
1952:  NASCAR Grand National Series
1970:  All-Star Racing League
1979–91:  ISMA (International SuperModified Association) Supermodifieds
1987–88:  American Indycar Series
1987–88, 1995–97:  NASCAR Busch North Series
1985–89, 1994: NASCAR Whelen Modified Tour

Track regulars who went on to Cup racing
Geoff Bodine
Brett Bodine
Todd Bodine
Jimmy Spencer

References
 "Through the Years at Shangri-La:  The Final Chapter".  Monnat, Michael E.  Gater Racing News, August 26, 2005.
 Bourcier, Bones.  RICHIE!: The Fast Life and Times of NASCAR's Greatest Modified Driver (1st ed., 2004).  Newburyport, Massachusetts, USA: Coastal 181.  .
Mark Southcott, NYRaceZone.com

External links

 Official Website
 Shangri-La II official website
 Shangri-La Speedway page at racing-reference.info

NASCAR tracks
Sports venues in New York (state)
Defunct motorsport venues in the United States
1946 establishments in New York (state)
Sports venues completed in 1946
2005 disestablishments in New York (state)